Nights at the Vanguard is an album by jazz pianist Tommy Flanagan, with bassist George Mraz and drummer Al Foster.

Recording and music 
The album was recorded on October 18–19, 1986, in concert at the Village Vanguard in New York City. Most of the material is not widely recorded, but it includes "More than You Know" and "All God's Chillun Got Rhythm".

Track listing 
Introduction – 1:52 		
"San Francisco Holiday" (Thelonious Monk) – 5:54 		
"Goodbye Mr. Evans" (Phil Woods) – 6:36 	
"Mark One" (Will Davis) – 6:16 	
"More Than You Know" (Edward Eliscu, Billy Rose, Vincent Youmans) – 5:33 	
"Out of the Past" (Benny Golson) – 7:26 	
"A Biddy Ditty" (Thad Jones) – 8:46 	
"While You Are Gone" (Lucky Thompson) – 4:23 	
"All God's Chillun Got Rhythm" (Walter Jurmann, Gus Kahn, Bronislaw Kaper) – 4:34 		
"I'll Keep Loving You" (Bud Powell) – 4:52 	
"Like Old Times" (Jones) – 6:34

Personnel 
 Tommy Flanagan – piano
 George Mraz – bass
 Al Foster – drums

References 

1987 live albums
Tommy Flanagan live albums
Albums produced by Rudy Van Gelder
Albums recorded at the Village Vanguard